is a Japanese holding company located in Himeji, Hyogo which is active in four business fields: lamps, manufacturing equipment, inspection equipment, and human resource services. It was formed in 2009 through business acquisition and integration instigated by Phoenix Electric Co. It is listed in the Tokyo Stock Exchange in the First Section.

History

Timeline
1976 - Phoenix Electric Co., Ltd. was established.
1989 - The company was listed in JASDAQ.
1995 - The company applied Chapter 11.
1996 - Listing in JASDAQ was discontinued.
1997 - Patent "double seal" was appeared.
1998 - Chapter 11 was finished.
2002 - The company was listed in JASDAQ.
2004 - The company won Porter prize: Michael E. Porter.
2005 - The company was listed in the Second Section: Tokyo Stock Exchange.
2006 - The company acquired ISO14001.
The company was listed in the First Section.

Large stock holders
namco
InFocus

References

External links
Phoenix Electric Co., Ltd.
Challenge! Revival Drama

Holding companies based in Tokyo
Holding companies established in 2009
Japanese companies established in 2009